Jerusalem Venture Partners (JVP) is an international venture capital firm founded in 1993. The fund specializes in investments in startup companies, focusing on digital media, enterprise software, semiconductors, data storage and cyber security, having raised close to $1.4 billion USD across nine funds. JVP is headquartered in Margalit Startup City Jerusalem with offices in Be'er Sheva, New York City and Paris.

Approach 
Aside from investment, JVP operates Margalit "startup cities" in Jerusalem, Be'er Sheva and New York. In May 2021, JVP founder Eren Margalit met with French officials, including minister of finance Bruno Le Maire, to discuss a Startup City in Paris. The cities operate like business incubators, providing portfolio companies with office space, mentoring, guidance and other business support. The fund also operates startup hubs in locations like Kiryat Shmona.

History
JVP was founded in Jerusalem in 1993 by Erel Margalit. The company oversaw the IPO of business intelligence software company QlikTech, and the sale of Chromatis Networks to Lucent Technologies for $4.8 billion, the largest sale of an Israeli company at the time. 

In May 2012 JVP portfolio company XtremIO, established in 2009, was sold to EMC Corporation for $430 million. Additional notable companies backed by JVP are Allot Communications, Altair Semiconductor, Cogent Communications, Cyber-Ark, Jacada, Navajo Systems, Netro, Playcast Media Systems, Precise, Qlipso, and XMPie.

In 2005, Forbes selected Margalit as the top-ranking non-American venture capitalist on its "Midas (The Golden Touch) List". In 2010, TheMarker named him the best venture capitalist in Israel.

In 2013, JVP signed an agreement to sell CyOptics Inc. to Avago Technologies, a developer of analog interface components, for $400 million.

In 2018, JVP increases its 8th VC fund to $200m.

In May 2019, JVP announced it would team up with Mars, Incorporated to invest in Israeli food technology.

In February 2020, JVP opened the International Cyber Center in NYC, Margalit Startup City New York. In November 2020, JVP announced an expansion of the Margalit Startup City in Jerusalem.

Investments 
Notable investments for JVP include CyberArk, Altair Semiconductor, Qlik and Cogent Communications.

Exits (partial list)

See also
Venture capital in Israel
Silicon Wadi
Science and technology in Israel

References 

Venture capital firms of Israel
Investment companies of Israel
Companies based in Jerusalem